The following is an incomplete list of video games which feature ninja, mostly in action and role-playing games, from the early 1980s to the present. It is organized in alphabetical order.

Game series

Games with ninja character classes

Games with ninja units

Games with ninja non-player characters
Bad Dudes Vs. DragonNinja and Hagane no Oni: Kidou Hohei Vs. Onna Ninja Gundan are two Ninja-titled games wherein the players are fighting exclusively against the ninja enemies.

Miscellaneous 
BMX Ninja and Ninja Scooter Simulator are two extreme sports games.

See also
List of ninja films
List of ninja television programs
Ninjas in popular culture

References

External links
Theme: Ninjas at MobyGames
All video games about stealthy assassins, saboteurs, or scouts of Japanese origin
 The Ninja Content: NINJA GAME

Ninja